Guided buses are buses capable of being steered by external means, usually on a dedicated track or roll way that excludes other traffic, permitting the maintenance of schedules even during rush hours. Unlike trolleybuses or rubber-tired trams, for part of their routes guided buses are able to share road space with general traffic along conventional roads, or with conventional buses on standard bus lanes.

Guidance systems can be physical, such as kerbs or guide bars, or remote, such as optical or radio guidance.

Guided buses may be articulated, allowing more passengers, but not as many as light rail or trams that do not also freely navigate public roads.

History

Precursors
The kerb-guided bus (KGB) guidance mechanism is a development of the early flangeways, pre-dating railways. The Gloucester and Cheltenham Tramroad
of 1809 therefore has a claim to be the earliest guided busway. There were earlier flangeways, but they did not carry passengers.

Modern examples
There are a few examples of guided buses around the world constructed since 1980.

The first modern guided busway system was opened in 1980 in Essen, Germany. This was initially a demonstration track, but it was periodically expanded and is still in operation as of 2019.

It closed in 1987.

Based on the experience in Essen, in 1986 the Government of South Australia opened the O-Bahn Busway in Adelaide. This is a 12-kilometre guided busway.

In Mannheim, Germany, from May 1992 to September 2005 a guided busway shared the tram alignment for a few hundred metres, which allowed buses to avoid a congested stretch of road where there was no space for an extra traffic lane. It was discontinued, as the majority of buses fitted with guide wheels were withdrawn for age reasons. There are no plans to convert newer buses.

The Nagoya Guideway Bus in Nagoya, opened in March 2001 and is the only guided bus line in Japan.

Between 2004 and 2008, a  section of guided busway was in operation between Stenhouse and Broomhouse in the west of Edinburgh.The route was later converted for use by Edinburgh trams.

Rubber-tyred trams

Guided buses are to be distinguished from rubber-tyred systems that cannot run other than along a dedicated trackway, or under fixed overhead power lines.

Guidance systems

Optical guidance

Optical guidance relies on the principles of image processing. A camera in the front of the vehicle scans the bands of paint on the ground representing the reference path. The signals obtained by the camera are sent to an onboard computer, which combines them with dynamic parameters of the vehicle (speed, yaw rate, wheel angle). The calculator transmits commands to the guidance motor located on the steering column of the vehicle to control its path in line with that of the reference.

Optical guidance is a means of approaching light rail performance with a fast and economical set-up. It enables buses to have precision-docking capabilities as efficient as those of light rail and reduces dwell times, making it possible to drive the vehicle to a precise point on a platform according to an accurate and reliable trajectory. The distance between the door steps and the platform is optimized not to exceed . Level boarding is then possible, and there is no need to use a mobile ramp for people with mobility impairments.

The Optiguide system, an optical guidance device developed by Siemens Transportation Systems, has been in revenue service since 2001 in Rouen and Nîmes (only at stations), France, and has been fitted to trolleybuses in Castellon (Spain) since June 2008.

Another system was introduced in 2017.  Called Autonomous Rail Rapid Transit (ART) and developed by CRRC, it uses optical systems to follow markers on a roadway.  The ART system is frequently referred to as a "trackless tram" and occasionally as an "optically-guided bus".

Magnetic guidance
Other experimental systems have non-mechanical guidance, such as sensors or magnets buried in the roadway.  In 2004, Stagecoach Group signed a deal with Siemens to develop an optical guidance system for use in the United Kingdom.

Two bus lines in Eindhoven, Netherlands, are used by Phileas vehicles. Line 402 from Eindhoven station to Veldhoven branches off from line 401 and adds another  of bus lanes and about 13 stops.

Some years ago, the regional authority for urban transport in the Eindhoven region (SRE) decided to discontinue the use of magnetic guidance system. In 2014 the manufacturer, APTS, was declared bankrupt.

The Douai region in France is developing a public transport network with dedicated infrastructure. The length of the lines will be . A number of stops will be placed on the right-hand side of each lane. Central stops between both lanes will be placed at locations with limited space at the right side. This requires vehicle to have doors on both sides.

On 3 November 2005, a licence and technology transfer agreement was signed between Advanced Public Transport Systems (APTS) and the Korea Railroad Research Institute (KRRI). KRRI was to develop the Korean version of Phileas vehicle by May 2011.

Since June 2013, 3 miles (1.5 miles each way) of the Emerald Express (EmX) BRT in Eugene, Oregon, has used magnetic guidance in revenue service on an especially curvy section of the route that also entails small radius S-curves required for docking.  The driver controls braking and acceleration.

Kerb guidance

On kerb-guided buses (KGB) small guide wheels attached to the bus engage vertical kerbs on either side of the guideway. These guide wheels push the steering mechanism of the bus, keeping it centralised on the track. Away from the guideway, the bus is steered in the normal way. The start of the guideway is funnelled from a wide track to guideway width. This system permits high-speed operation on a narrow guideway and precise positioning at boarding platforms, facilitating access for the elderly and disabled.  As guide wheels can be inexpensively attached to, and removed from, almost any standard model of bus, kerb guided busway systems are not tied to particular specialised vehicles or equipment suppliers. Characteristically, operators contracted to run services on kerb-guided busways will purchase or lease the vehicles, as second-hand vehicles (with guide wheels removed) have a ready resale market.

The kerb-guided system maintains a narrow track while still enabling buses to pass one another at speed. Consequently, kerb-guided track can be fitted into former double-track rail alignments without the requirement for additional land-take that might have been necessary were a disused railway to be converted into a public highway. Examples include the Cambridgeshire Guided Busway and Leigh-Salford-Manchester Bus Rapid Transit; in both schemes, it has proved possible to provide space for a wide multi-user path for leisure use alongside the kerb-guided double track, all within the boundaries of the disused railway route. Both the Cambridgeshire and Leigh-Salford-Manchester schemes have reported greatly increased levels of patronage (both on the buses themselves and the adjacent paths), high levels of modal transfer of travellers from private car use, and high levels of passenger satisfaction.

Examples of guided busways

 Bristol, England – MetroBus – 2018
 Cambridgeshire Guided Busway, England – Huntingdon to Trumpington – 2011
 Leigh-Salford-Manchester Bus Rapid Transit – 2016
 Essen, Germany – 1980
 O-Bahn Busway, Adelaide, Australia – 1986
 Yutorīto Line, Nagoya, Japan. – 2001 – In Japan, the bus is legally considered as a sort of railway.
 CRRC Autonomous Rail Rapid Transit:
 Yibin, Sichuan, China
 Zhuzhou, Hunan, China
 Yongxiu, Jiangxi, China

Tram-like guided busways (rubber-tyred trams) include:
 Translohr – Clermont-Ferrand and lines 5&6 in Paris, France; Shanghai and Tianjin, China; Medellín, Colombia; Padua and Venice-Mestre, Italy. Also called "trams on rubber tyres".
 Bombardier Guided Light Transit – Caen, France; Nancy, France.  The first one is replaced with conventional trams and the other is being used as a trolleybus without the guide system.

Gallery

See also

 Automated guideway transit
 Autonomous Rail Rapid Transit
 Bombardier Guided Light Transit
 Bus rapid transit
 Bus rapid transit creep
 Dual-mode bus
 Guide rail
 Kassel curb
 Road–rail buses
 Road-rail vehicle
 Rubber-tyred metro
 Straddling bus
 Translohr
 Trolleybus
 Trackless train

References

External links

 Guided bus information and pictures
 Adelaide O-Bahn 
 First Group guided busways
 Translohr official site
 Guided Light Transit official web site
 Cambridgeshire County Council's Guided Busway project
 "An Update on Curb Guided Bus Technology and Deployment Trends", Journal of Public transport 2006 BRT Special Edition (PDF 964Kb)
 University of Minnesota's ITS Institute "BRT Technologies: Assisting Drivers Operating Buses on Road Shoulders" 

Buses by type